The Madelvic Motor Carriage Company of Granton, Scotland was an early car manufacturing company.

History 

The company was founded by William Peck, Edinburgh's City Astronomer, to develop the emerging technology of electricity. Madelvic produced an 'electric brougham' at their factory in Granton, north Edinburgh, between 1898 and 1900. The vehicle was driven by a three-wheeled front axle unit, comprising motor, batteries and a small central wheel, set behind the axle, which propelled the car. This unit was mounted to the front of a chassis, creating a five-wheeled vehicle, but could also be attached to a horse-drawn carriage. Peck offered public transport using the car, between Granton and Leith as publicity. A more conventional front wheel drive electric vehicle was also briefly produced. However, electric cars were not to be the future, and Madelvic went bankrupt, being taken over by the Kingsburgh Motor Company in 1900.

The original factory building still stands in Granton, and is currently being renovated for residential and office use. It is the oldest surviving car factory in Britain. After Madelvic ceased production, cars were built here by Kingsburgh, and then by the Stirlings Motor Carriages Ltd, who also built buses on the site, exporting some to Australia. In 1925 the buildings were bought by United Wire, and used by them until 2001 when they were purchased by the development company Waterfront Edinburgh Limited, a joint venture between City of Edinburgh Council and Scottish Enterprise.

Buredi, a joint venture between The Burrell Company and the City of Edinburgh Council, had hoped to redevelop the factory to create a range of residential apartments, townhouses and commercial office space. The renovation was designed by Malcolm Fraser Architects. The building is on the Buildings at Risk Register for Scotland.

See also 
 List of car manufacturers of the United Kingdom

References

History of Electric Vehicles
Edinburgh Architecture
British Motor Manufacturers
Granton History Group

External links
 The Madelvic development

Defunct motor vehicle manufacturers of Scotland
Electric vehicles introduced in the 19th century
Manufacturing companies based in Edinburgh
Car manufacturers of the United Kingdom
Veteran vehicles
Buildings at Risk Register for Scotland
1898 establishments in Scotland
1900 disestablishments in Scotland
British companies disestablished in 1900
British companies established in 1898
Granton, Edinburgh